is a Japanese manga dōjin group. It was active from 1962 to 2016. The representative of the group is Osaka-born Yoshiaki Baba, who established the group while in junior high school. Although it was a group of amateurs, many professional mangaka also enrolled.

Main activities 
Another member criticized the manga reviewed by the member, and it was published in the newsletter.

They did not participate in dōjinshi spot sale, but they published dōjin books Nakama for members and GROUP (issued by SG Planning) that can also be obtained at bookstore route. Meanwhile, thinking that direct viewing of manga manuscripts leads to an improvement in technique, he was producing a "circulation magazine" that stitched manga manuscripts into books until the 1980s.

There were members who became professional mangaka. Yuki Hijiri's Locke the Superman was first published for members of the Sakuga Group in 1967, and was later serialized in a Shōnen King. As the fans joined, in the 1980s the number of members exceeded 1,000.

Gassaku 
Gassaku ("collaboration") where many members jointly write manga was also done, and it was published in manga magazines. List works that are individually published as books.

  - Weekly Shōnen Magazine, (1972)
  - Weekly Shōjo Comic, (1977)
  - Weekly Shōjo Friend, (1981)
  - Weekly Shōnen King, (1978)
  - Shōnen King, (1982)
  - Sakuga Group series, (1984)

Member of a professional Artists

Mangaka 
 Ryō Azumi

Novelist 
 Eiji Ōtsuka

References 

Doujin
Manga artists